Left Hand Canyon is a canyon, near Boulder, Colorado, United States.

The area

It is a natural area, and has much wildlife.

Uses

It has been used for offroading, but along with target shooting, this is now forbidden.

See also
Left Hand Creek (Colorado)

References

External links
A map

Landforms of Boulder County, Colorado
Canyons and gorges of Colorado